Andrés Héctor Carvallo Acosta (8 November 1862, Asunción – 16 August 1934) was a Paraguayan politician.

He served as President of the Chamber of Deputies. Later he served as Vice President from 1898 to 1902, and as acting President of Paraguay between January 9, 1902, and November 25, 1902. He was a member of the Colorado Party.

References

1862 births
1934 deaths
People from Asunción
Presidents of Paraguay
Vice presidents of Paraguay
Presidents of the Senate of Paraguay
Presidents of the Chamber of Deputies of Paraguay
Colorado Party (Paraguay) politicians